Harry Hess (born 1968) is a Canadian singer and guitarist.

Harry Hess may also refer to:
 Harry Hammond Hess (1906–1969), American geologist and United States Navy officer during World War II
 Harry Hess (American football), American college football coach

See also
 Harold Hess (1895–1982), American college football and basketball coach